This list of hills of Berlin includes the main high points located in the German state of Berlin arranged alphabetically.

A
Ahrensfelder Berge

B
Biesdorfer Höhe
Böttcherberg

D
Dörferblick

E
Ehrenpfortenberg

F
Falkenberg
Fichtenberg

G
Großer Bunkerberg
Großer Müggelberg

H

Havelberg
Heinersdorfer Berg
Humboldthöhe

I
Insulaner

K
Karlsberg
Kienberg
Kreuzberg

M
Marienhöhe
Müggelberge

O
Oderbruchkippe

R
Rauenberg
Rixdorfer Höhe
Rudower Höhe

S
Schäferberg
Seddinberg
Stener Berg

T
Teufelsberg

W
Windmühlenberg

Mountains
Berlin